Bagra Peak is the peak rising to 1990 m in the north part of Petvar Heights, southeast Sentinel Range in Ellsworth Mountains, Antarctica, and overlooking Kornicker Glacier to the northwest, Razboyna Glacier to the northeast, and Drama Glacier to the east.

The peak is named after the settlement of Bagra in Southern Bulgaria.

Location
US mapping in 1961, updated in 1988.

See also
 Mountains in Antarctica

Maps
 Vinson Massif.  Scale 1:250 000 topographic map.  Reston, Virginia: US Geological Survey, 1988.
 Antarctic Digital Database (ADD). Scale 1:250000 topographic map of Antarctica. Scientific Committee on Antarctic Research (SCAR). Since 1993, regularly updated.

Notes

References
 Bagra Peak. SCAR Composite Antarctic Gazetteer.
 Bulgarian Antarctic Gazetteer. Antarctic Place-names Commission. (details in Bulgarian, basic data in English)

External links
 Bagra Peak. Copernix satellite image

Ellsworth Mountains
Bulgaria and the Antarctic
Mountains of Ellsworth Land